David Gregory is an investigative attorney and accountant. In 2016, he was elected to the Missouri House of Representatives. He is the founder of The Injury Counsel, a law firm in Clayton, Missouri.

Missouri House of Representatives 
Gregory was elected to the Missouri House of Representatives in 2016, representing the 96th District which covers South St. Louis County. In his first term as State Representative, David audited the Department of Revenue and found $36 million in potential savings for Missouri taxpayers. To implement his findings, the then Director of the Department of Revenue, Ken Zellers created an ongoing initiative called, Strike Force Gregory. He was named Freshman Legislator of the Year for outstanding work on preventing government waste, fraud and abuse.

In 2021, he investigated ways to counter anti-competitive practices in the meat-packing industry that negatively impact Missouri cattlemen.

Committee assignments (present) 
 Special Committee on Government Accountability, chairman
 Rules, Administrative Oversight
 Budget

Committee assignments (past) 
 Judiciary, chairman

Missouri State Auditor election 
He is a contender for the 2022 Missouri State Auditor Election. He is a Republican candidate and is endorsed by the Missouri Fraternal Order of Police and other organizations. His campaign, which raised more than $1 million, was supported by 80 state representatives, notable individuals like David Steward and professional athletes like Ozzie Smith, Bernie Federko, Deron Cherry and Neil Smith.

Electoral history

Legal career 
Gregory practices as a litigator in the St. Louis Area. He is the founder of The Injury Counsel law firm. In 2019, he won a business fraud lawsuit with a $1.63 million jury verdict, and, in 2021, an animal abuse case for $1.3 million. Gregory has been selected to Super Lawyers’ Rising Stars.

Life and education
David is a lifelong Missourian and he lives in the south St. Louis County region with his wife, Paige. He has an accounting degree, a Masters of Business Administration, and a Juris Doctor from Saint Louis University.

References

Living people
Republican Party members of the Missouri House of Representatives
21st-century American politicians
Year of birth missing (living people)